Jan Kralj (born 3 March 1995) is a Slovenian snowboarder. He has competed at the 2014 Winter Olympics in Sochi.

References

1995 births
Living people
Slovenian male snowboarders
Snowboarders at the 2014 Winter Olympics
Olympic snowboarders of Slovenia
Snowboarders at the 2012 Winter Youth Olympics
21st-century Slovenian people